Wylie Gelber (born May 13, 1988) is a professional bassist and guitar maker from Los Angeles, California. A founding member of the band Dawes, Gelber plays bass on every song of the eight albums released by the band.

Career

Simon Dawes 
Gelber dropped out of high school to tour as the bassist in the post-punk band Simon Dawes. The band broke up in 2007 when guitarist Blake Mills left.

Dawes 
Following the break up of Simon Dawes, Gelber and former bandmates Griffin and Taylor Goldsmith formed the folk rock band Dawes, which released its first album, North Hills, in 2009. The band tours extensively and has released eight full-length studio albums.

In February 2023, it was announced on social media that Gelber would be departing the lineup following the band's spring tour dates to focus on other projects, including Gelber & Sons.

Gelber & Sons 
Gelber also operates Gelber & Sons, a Los Angeles company that makes guitars.

References

External links 
Gelber & Sons
Dawes - Love Is All I Am
 Dawes - When My Time Comes
 Wylie Gelber Bass Solo - 2017
 Wylie Gelber interview - Kyle Meredith

1988 births
21st-century American bass guitarists
Living people
American rock bass guitarists
Male bass guitarists
Dawes (band) members
American musical instrument makers
Guitar makers
21st-century American male musicians